"Corcovado" (known in English as "Quiet Nights of Quiet Stars") is a bossa nova song and jazz standard written by Antônio Carlos Jobim in 1960. English lyrics were later written by Gene Lees. The Portuguese title refers to the Corcovado mountain in Rio de Janeiro.

Tony Bennett recorded the first popular English cover of "Quiet Nights" with new lyrics by Buddy Kaye in 1963. Numerous English cover recordings then followed sometimes credited to Lees and/or Kaye and Lees, including the Andy Williams recording of the song with English lyrics, reaching #92 in the Billboard Hot 100 and #18 in the Hot Adult Contemporary Tracks chart in 1965. Also receiving air-play, contemporaneously with Andy Williams' recording of "Quiet Nights," was Kitty Kallen's version. Her album, titled "Quiet Nights," was released by 20th Century-Fox Records in 1964.

Notable recordings
It is now considered a jazz standard, having been recorded by:
João Gilberto – O Amor, o Sorriso e a Flor (1960)
Sylvia Telles – Amor em Hi-Fi (1960)
Cannonball Adderley and Sérgio Mendes – Cannonball's Bossa Nova (1962)
Miles Davis – Quiet Nights (1962)
Stan Getz, Antônio Carlos Jobim, João Gilberto and Astrud Gilberto – Getz/Gilberto (1963)
Tony Bennett – I Wanna Be Around... (1963)
Charlie Byrd – Brazilian Byrd (1964)
Vince Guaraldi – The Latin Side of Vince Guaraldi (1964)
Caterina Valente – Valente on TV (1964)
Morgana King – on TV at Hollywood Palace (1964)
Oscar Peterson – We Get Requests (1964)
Sérgio Mendes – Sergio Mendes & Bossa Rio (1964)
Blossom Dearie – May I Come In (1964)
Nancy Wilson – How Glad I Am (1964)
Sarah Vaughan – Viva! Vaughan (Remastered) (1965)
Doris Day – Latin for Lovers (1965)
Henry Mancini – The Latin Sound of Henry Mancini (1965)
Grant Green – I Want to Hold Your Hand (1965)
Cliff Richard – Kinda Latin (1965)
Monica Zetterlund — Ett lingonris som satts i cocktailglas (1965)
Earl Grant – Bali Ha'i (1966)
Shirley Scott – On a Clear Day (1966)
Tommy Leonetti – Trombones, Guitars and Me (1966)
Frank Sinatra and Antônio Carlos Jobim – Francis Albert Sinatra & Antonio Carlos Jobim (1967)
Engelbert Humperdinck – Release Me (1967)
Nara Leão – Dez Anos Depois (1971)
Astrud Gilberto – Jazz Masters 9 (1973)
Mary Wilson – The Supremes Live! In Japan (1973)
Elis Regina and Antonio Carlos Jobim – Elis & Tom (1974)
Rita Reys and Metropole Orchestra – Rita Reys Sings Antonio Carlos Jobim (1981)
Ella Fitzgerald – Ella Abraça Jobim (1981)
Laura Fygi – The Lady Wants to Know (1994)
Tom Grant - Instinct (1995)
Everything but the Girl – Red Hot + Rio (1996)
Karrin Allyson – Daydream (1997)
Django Bates – Quiet Nights (1998)
Chris Connor – I Walk with Music (2002)
Jacintha – The Girl from Bossa Nova (2004)
Holly Shelton – Memphis Jazz Box (2004)
Adalberto Bravo – Smooth Passions (2004)
Joey DeFrancesco with Jimmy Smith – Legacy (2005)
Stacey Kent and Jim Tomlinson – The Lyric  (2005)
Olivia Ong – A Girl Meets Bossa Nova  (2005)
Theresa Sokyrka – These Old Charms (2005)
Karita Mattila – Fever (2007)
Art Garfunkel – Some Enchanted Evening (2007)
Queen Latifah – Trav'lin' Light (2007)
Woven Hand – Ten Stones (2008)
Diana Panton – ...If the Moon Turns Green (2008)
Señor Coconut and His Orchestra – Around the World with Señor Coconut and His Orchestra (2008)
Diana Krall – Quiet Nights (2009)
Iuko Maeda – Encontro (2012)
Karen Aoki – Tranquility (2012)
Andrea Bocelli with Nelly Furtado – Passione (2013)
Andrea Motis with Joan Chamorro Quintet and Scott Hamilton (2014)
Matt Dusk and Margaret – Just the Two of Us (2015)
Zule Guerra y Blues de Habana – Blues de Habana (2015)
Caroll Vanwelden – Portraits of Brazil (2016)
Sara Dowling – Bossa Nova (2016)
Steve Turre – Colors for the Masters (2016)

See also
List of bossa nova standards

References

1960 songs
1965 singles
Songs with music by Antônio Carlos Jobim
Songs with lyrics by Gene Lees
Andy Williams songs
Frank Sinatra songs
Everything but the Girl songs
Queen Latifah songs
Vikki Carr songs
Caterina Valente songs
Bossa nova songs
Brazilian songs
Portuguese-language songs